The 2014 IPC Athletics European Championships was a track and field competition for athletes with a disability open to International Paralympic Committee (IPC) affiliated countries within Europe, plus Azerbaijan and Israel. It was held in Swansea, Wales and lasted from 18 to 23 August. The competition was staged at Swansea University Stadium. Approximately 550 athletes from 37 countries attended the games.

Russia won the Games atop the medal table with 41 Gold medals, and also collected the greatest overall medal haul with 88. The host nation, Britain, finished third. Of the 37 competing nations, 34 managed to achieve a podium finish. There were seven world records set and a further seven European records, in a games that was beset by difficult weather conditions throughout the tournament.

Venue

The venue for the Championships was the Swansea University athletics stadium.

Format
The 2014 IPC Athletics European Championships is an invitational tournament taking in track and field events. No combined sports were included in the 2014 Championships. Not all events were open to all classifications, though no events were contested between classifications.

Athletes finishing in first place are awarded the gold medal, second place the silver medal and third place the bronze. If only three competitors are available to challenge for an event then no bronze medal is awarded. Some events will be classed as 'no medal' events.

Coverage
As with the 2013 IPC Athletics World Championships, the IPC produced live streaming footage of the Championships on ParalympicSport.TV. In the United Kingdom Channel 4 continued their commitment to para-sport with their own live streaming website and daily live coverage shown on their sister channel More4.

Events

Opening ceremony
The Championship opening ceremony took place at the Swansea University Stadium on the night of 18 August the day before the first events were held. The competition was officially opened by Welsh Assembly Minister John Griffiths followed by an address by the IPC president Sir Philip Craven.

The IPC flag carried into the stadium by schoolgirl Molly Hopkins, the youngest Swansea 2014 ambassador, Paralympian champion John Harris, swimmer Jack Thomas and games volunteer Harmony Dumay; before it was raised to signal the opening of the games. The swearing of the oaths were undertaken by Welsh athlete Josie Pearson, her coach Anthony Hughes, and on behalf of the officials by Matt Witt.

Entertainment was provided at the venue by singers Shaheen Jafargholi and John Adams; and the Morriston Orpheus Choir.

Classification

To ensure competition is as fair and balanced as possible, athletes are classified dependent on how their disability impacts on their chosen event/s. Thus athletes may compete in an event against competitors with a different disability to themselves. Where there are more than one classification in one event, (for example discus throw F54/55/56), a points system is used to determine the winner.

F = field athletes
T = track athletes
11-13 – visually impaired, 11 and 12 compete with a sighted guide
20 – intellectual disability
31-38 – cerebral palsy or other conditions that affect muscle co-ordination and control. Athletes in class 31-34 compete in a seated position; athletes in class 35-38 compete standing.
41-46 – amputation, les autres
51-58 – wheelchair athletes

Schedule

Medal table 
The end medal table after day 5, showing all medal winning countries.

Multiple medallists
Many competitors won multiple medals at the 2014 Championships. The following athletes won four medals or more.

Highlights

Broken records
Fourteen records were broken including seven world records.

Participating nations
Below is the list of countries who agreed to participate in the Championships and the requested number of athlete places for each.

	6
	5
	6
	5
	10
	15
	7
	2
	11
	19
	32
	52
	35
	7
	8
	3
	2
	13
	8
	11
	1
	1
	4
	23
	33
	22
	3
	74
	9
	5
	2
	31
	8
	9
	12
	24
	34

See also
2014 European Athletics Championships

Footnotes
Notes

References

External links
 Official web-site

 
World Para Athletics European Championships
IPC Athletics European Championships
IPC Athletics European Championships
International athletics competitions hosted by Wales
Sport in Swansea